Elipsocus is a genus of damp barklice in the family Elipsocidae. There are more than 20 described species in Elipsocus.

Species
These 27 species belong to the genus Elipsocus:

 Elipsocus abdominalis Reuter, 1904
 Elipsocus alettae Smithers, 1962
 Elipsocus alpinus Smithers, 1962
 Elipsocus annulatus Roesler, 1954
 Elipsocus azoricus Meinander, 1975
 Elipsocus brincki Badonnel, 1963
 Elipsocus capensis Smithers, 1962
 Elipsocus coloripennis Lienhard, 1996
 Elipsocus fasciatus (Navas, 1908)
 Elipsocus guentheri Mockford, 1980
 Elipsocus hyalinus (Stephens, 1836)
 Elipsocus ignobilis Broadhead & Richards, 1982
 Elipsocus kuriliensis Vishnyakova, 1986
 Elipsocus labralis Lienhard, 1996
 Elipsocus lanceloticus Baz, 1991
 Elipsocus marplatensis Williner, 1943
 Elipsocus mbizianus Smithers, 1962
 Elipsocus moebiusi Tetens, 1891
 Elipsocus nuptialis Roesler, 1954
 Elipsocus obscurus Mockford, 1980
 Elipsocus oligotrichus Thornton, 1959
 Elipsocus pumilis (Hagen, 1861)
 Elipsocus pusillus Lienhard, 1996
 Elipsocus rubrostigma Navas, 1934
 Elipsocus ustulatus Smithers, 1965
 Elipsocus viridimicans Günther Enderlein, 1900
 † Elipsocus abnormis (Pictet-Baraban & Hagen, 1856)

References

Elipsocidae
Articles created by Qbugbot
Psocoptera genera